The Caulfield Classic, raced as the Neds Classic due to sponsorship and registered as the Norman Robinson Stakes, is a Melbourne Racing Club Group 3 Thoroughbred horse race held under set weights conditions, for horses three years old, run over a distance of 2000 metres. It is held at Caulfield Racecourse in Melbourne, Australia on Caulfield Cup day in October. Prizemoney is A$200,000.

History
The race was run as a handicap until 1990, now run under set weight conditions. Originally the race was scheduled on the second day of the VATC Spring carnival. The registered name of the race is named after the former VATC Chairman Norman Robinson who was elected to that position in 1942. The MRC increased the  prizemoney in 2014 to A$750,000 with a $250,000 bonus to the winner of the Caulfield Guineas or Thousand Guineas if they are able to win both events.  In 2015, the prizemoney was reduced to $500,000.
The event is  considered a strong preparatory race for the Victoria Derby.

Grade
1978 - Listed race
1978 - Special race
 1980–1997 - Listed Race
 1998–1999 - Group 3
 2000–2004 - Group 2
 2005 onwards  - Group 3

Name
 1971–1978 - Wallace Stakes
 1979–1988 - Norman Robinson Stakes
 1989 - Steeves Lumley Stakes
 1990–2013 - Norman Robinson Stakes
 2014–2015 - Caulfield Classic
 2016 onwards - Ladbrokes Classic

Distance
The race has been run over 2000 metres with exceptions of:
 1971 - 1 miles (~2000 metres)
 1979 – 1984 metres
 2003 – 2020 metres

Double winners
Thoroughbreds that have won the Norman Robinson Stakes – Victoria Derby double:
 Nothin’ Leica Dane (1995), Blackfriars (1999), Amalfi (2001), Polanski (2013)

Winners

 2022 - Mr Maestro
 2021 - Gunstock
 2020 - Albarado
 2019 - Thought Of That
 2018 - Thinkin’ Big
 2017 - Cliff's Edge
 2016 - Good Standing
 2015 - Sacred Eye
 2014 - Fontein Ruby
 2013 - Polanski
 2012 - Hvasstan
 2011 - Sabrage
 2010 - Retrieve
 2009 - Shamoline Warrior
 2008 - Pre Eminence
 2007 - Pillar Of Hercules
 2006 - Get Square
 2005 - Pendragon
 2004 - Cedar Manor
 2003 - Casual Pass
 2002 - Platinum Scissors
 2001 - Amalfi
 2000 - Royale Exit
 1999 - Blackfriars
 1998 - Lawyer
 1997 - Brave Prince
 1996 - Mustang Ranch
 1995 - Nothin’ Leica Dane
 1994 - Punctual
 1993 - Battle Hawk
 1992 - River Hero
 1991 - Lady Purpose
 1990 - Big Dermott
 1989 - Counterfeit
 1988 - Panneria
 1987 - Omnicorp
 1986 - Dundas Lane
 1985 - Born To Be Queen
 1984 - Gold Deck
 1983 - King Delamere
 1982 - Brightman
 1981 - Lordship
 1980 - Bright Halo
 1979 - Attack
 1978 - Society Beau

See also
 List of Australian Group races
 Group races

References

Horse races in Australia
Flat horse races for three-year-olds
Caulfield Racecourse
1971 establishments in Australia
Recurring sporting events established in 1971